As of July 2016, the International Union for Conservation of Nature (IUCN) lists 238 conservation dependent species. 0.29% of all evaluated species are listed as conservation dependent. 
The IUCN also lists seven subspecies and five varieties as conservation dependent.

Of the animal subpopulations evaluated by the IUCN, one species subpopulation and one subspecies subpopulation has been assessed as conservation dependent.

The conservation dependent category is part of the IUCN 1994 Categories & Criteria (version 2.3), which is no longer used in evaluation of taxa, but persists in the IUCN Red List for taxa evaluated prior to 2001, when version 3.1 was first used. Using the 2001 (v3.1) system these taxa are classed as near threatened, but those that have not been re-evaluated remain with the "conservation dependent" category.

This is a complete list of conservation dependent species and subspecies evaluated by the IUCN. Species and subspecies which have conservation dependent subpopulations are also indicated.

Plants
There are 209 species, seven subspecies, and five varieties of plant assessed as conservation dependent.

Dicotyledons
There are 193 species, seven subspecies, and three varieties of dicotyledon assessed as conservation dependent.

Theales

Malvales

Species

Subspecies
Elaeocarpus submonoceras subsp. collinus

Lecythidales

Violales

Euphorbiales

Laurales

Ebenales
There are 19 species, one subspecies, and one variety in Ebenales assessed as conservation dependent.

Symplocaceae
Symplocos longipes
Symplocos pyriflora

Sapotaceae

Species

Subspecies
Chrysophyllum lucentifolium subsp. lucentifolium
Varieties
Isonandra perakensis var. perakensis

Ebenaceae
Diospyros johorensis
Diospyros macrocarpa

Celastrales

Myrtales

Species

Varieties
Memecylon acuminatum var. acuminatum

Sapindales

Magnoliales

Species

Subspecies
Horsfieldia subalpina subsp. kinabaluensis

Rosales

Species

Subspecies
Sorbus austriaca subsp. croatica

Apiales

Solanales

Nepenthales

Ericales

Species

Subspecies
Erica scoparia subsp. platycodon

Fabales

Species

Subspecies
Leucaena leucocephala subsp. ixtahuacana

Fagales

Species

Subspecies
Quercus petraea subsp. huguetiana

Other dicotyledons

Species

Varieties
Davidia involucrata var. involucrata

Monocotyledons
There are 16 species and two varieties of monocotyledon assessed as conservation dependent.

Arecales

Species

Varieties
Rhopalostylis baueri var. baueri
Rhopalostylis baueri var. cheesemanii

Pandanales
Pandanus clandestinus

Animals

Mollusks

Arthropods

Fish

Reptiles

Mammals
Subpopulations and stocks
Bowhead whale (1 subpopulation/stock)
Northern blue whale (1 subpopulation/stock)

See also 
 Lists of IUCN Red List near threatened species

References